Projects in the Jungle is the second studio album by American heavy metal band Pantera, released on July 27, 1984, by Metal Magic Records. The band made their first music video for the track "All Over Tonight". Though sharing many similarities with Def Leppard's pre-Hysteria sound (Pyromania had been released the year before), the title track's musical style is a foreshadowing of what was to come a few years later, as it features a thrash metal-oriented guitar riff with more groove metal-like breakdowns.

Reception
In a retrospective review for AllMusic, Eduardo Rivadavia gave the album 2.5 stars out of a possible 5. He described Terry Glaze's vocal style as "ear assaulting" and the lyrics as "frequently moronic" examples of glam metal cliches of the era. Nonetheless, Projects in the Jungle was "a major improvement over the band's tentative performance on debut album Metal Magic, and its much improved production clarity and musicianship spoke volumes of Pantera's growing professionalism and maturity."

Track listing
All credits adapted from the original LP.

Personnel
Pantera
Terry Glaze – vocals, keyboards
Diamond Darrell – guitar
Rex Rocker – bass
Vinnie Paul – drums

Production
Jerry Abbott – producer, engineer, mixing
M.C. Rather – mastering
Recorded and mixed at Pantego Sound, Pantego, Texas

References

Pantera albums
1984 albums